Paulina is the fifth studio album by Mexican singer Paulina Rubio. It was released on May 23, 2000 internationally by Universal Latino and marks her first record production with American global music corporation. Rubio worked with writers and producers such as Estéfano (mostly), Chris Rodríguez, Armando Manzanero, Juan Gabriel, Christian De Walden, and Richard Daniel Roman. The album explores a more variety sounds much different to the vein of her albums with EMI Music, and has an overall latin pop and dance-pop vibe, with influences from rock, ranchera, bolero, funk and house. Elaborating a "synthesis of the end of the millennium" theme for the album, Rubio reinvented her image.

Paulina was generally acclaimed by most critics and earned Latin Grammy Award nominations. In 2001, Billboard cited it as the best-selling Latin album of 2001 in the U.S. The record was a commercial success, reaching at number one both the Top Latin Albums and Latin Pop Albums charts, and debuted on the Billboard 200, making it her first album to appear on that chart. It received worldwide certifications, including octuple platinum (Latin) by the Recording Industry Association of America (RIAA) for 800,000 units shipped in the United States. In Mexico, is one of the best-selling albums according to Asociación Mexicana de Productores de Fonogramas y Videogramas (AMPROFON). Paulina is Rubio's most successful album with sales of over 3 million copies worldwide, becoming one of the best-selling "Latin" albums.

Seven singles were released from the album. The lead single, "Lo Haré Por Ti" became an international hit. Its second single "El Último Adiós" peaked at number one in Latin America. Its third single "Y Yo Sigo Aquí", which is often recognised as Rubio's signature international song, received a nomination for the Latin Grammy Award for Song of the Year at the 2001 ceremony became a massive commercial success. Follow-up singles "Yo No Soy Esa Mujer" and "Vive El Verano" also performed well on charts internationally. The latest singles "Sexi Dance" and "Tal Vez, Quizá" are often considered classic Rubio songs. To promote the album, she embarked on her concert tour Paulina.

Background

After establishing herself in the Latin music industry as "La Chica Dorada", in summer 1996, Paulina Rubio released her fourth studio album, Planeta Paulina. The album represented a drastic change in the singer's musical direction, incorporating elements of dance and electronic music. The public was unimpressed with her new musical direction, despite the fact that critics were convinced by her new sound. The backlash resulted in Planeta Paulina having little impact on commercial performance.

The executives of EMI Music record company proposed to release an album in English, which would mean her crossover in the United States and Europe, but as the months passed, they canceled the musical project, which motivated Rubio to seek a new record label. However, EMI Music did not yield to her request, due two years earlier she signed a contract that provided for the release of three albums with EMI Music over the course of four years. After embarking on a promotional tour for the rest of 1997, Rubio had one album pending to record with that label, because "I didn't want to record what they proposed to me."

Early 1998, Rubio continued work on new music, and sought to terminate the contract with EMI Music. At the end of that year, Universal Music Latino became interested in Rubio's creative process and her new music, so the record company bought the old contract from EMI Music and signed a new one with the division in Latin America. Rubio left EMI Music in November 1998, ending their six-year relationship.

Development  and production
Soon after, Rubio began work on her fifth studio album. On it she collaborated with producers and writers such as Spanish singer-songwriter Nacho Cano, from the Spanish band Mecano, and Armando Manzanero. The album was recorded mostly at Midnight Studios in Miami, Florida. Only "Vive El Verano" and an unreleased song titled "Es El Verano" was recorded in Barcelo, Spain, in the period when Rubio was a television host in the show Vive El Verano aired by Antena 3. Rubio took nearly two years to prepare her fifth studio album. The singer updated her music and got ready for this new challenge with new producers and songwriters such as Estéfano, Armando Manzanero, Alejandro García Abad, Ralf Stemmann, Christian De Walden, Richard Daniel Román, Ignacio Ballesteros and Juan Gabriel.

Promotion
The first album of Paulina Rubio's career to bear Universal Music Group label, Paulina was released on May 23, 2000. In Mexico it was released one month before, while in Italy was released in 2001. To promote the album, Rubio appeared on several tv shows. In Argentina, she  appeared specially at Telemanias where she performed several songs, including "Lo Haré Por Ti", "El Último Adiós", "Sexi Dance", and "Tal Vez, Quizá". Approaching to greet the audience, she expressed her support for women's liberation movement, effusively shouted "up women's liberation!".

Rubio did an extensive promotion campaign for the album, appearing on various television programs and at music festivals. As well, she embarked on her first concert world tour, called Paulina Tour. She performed in Mexico and United States in Summer 2001.

Singles
"Lo Haré Por Ti" was released in January 2000 as the album's lead single. It marked Rubio's return to industry music, reached at number one in several countries. The video show Rubio reinvented with a style eclectic and sexy. "El Último Adiós" was then released in July 2000 as the second single in Latin America and reached at number one in Mexico, Colombia and Chile. The controversial music video contained racy love scenes, as well as men and women appearing barely clothed.

In November 2000, "Y Yo Sigo Aquí" was released as the third single in America and the second in Europe. The song reached number one in 30 countries and number three in Billboard Hot Latin Songs chart. An English version titled "Sexual Lover" of the song with released in summer 2001. Rubio performed the song on the British music show Top of the Pops. "Yo No Soy Esa Mujer" was released as the fourth single from Paulina in April 2001 reaching number seven in the Hot Latin Songs chart. It became her fourth number-one single in Mexico.

"Vive El Verano", written by Richard Daniel Roman and Ignacio Ballesteros was released as the album's fifth single in June 2001, charting at number 31 in Italy. The song was released only in Europe as a third single from Paulina. This enabled it to European Albums chart at number 56. "Sexi Dance" was initially issued as a club-only track in America, but was a success where it reached number 34 on the Billboard Hot Latin Songs chart. The song also appeared as an English version titled "Fire (Sexy Dance)" of Rubio's subsequent studio album Border Girl.

"Tal Vez, Quizá", written by Armando Manzanero was released as the album's sixth and final single in September 2001. The song earned critical acclaim.

Paulina spawned official seven singles and other two songs were released as promotional singles. "Sin Aire" was launched in Spain in the summer of 2001 and "Mírame a Los Ojos" in Brazil for the promotion of a soap opera, but it was well accepted that it was launched on radio stations.

Critical reception

At the time of its release, Paulina received universal acclaim from critics; most of them acknowledged Rubio's mature perceptions. Steve Huey of AllMusic gave the album 4.5 out of 5 stars, and considered the album "[a] plenty of infectious Latin pop, plus a few show-stopping ballads". He concluded, "Display a variety that's never been quite so fully realized on a Rubio album before. All in all, it's one of her best to date." Joey Guerra from Amazon highlighted the majority tracks while summing the album up as a "most diverse and mature", and acclaimed Rubio as the "Latin pop for the new millennium." El Tiempo noted that the album sees Rubio "plays to present different feminine facets with various resources: the versatility of her voice, sometimes huskier ("El Último Adiós"), sometimes turned into a subtle thread ("Tal Vez, Quizá"), but energetic in general." In an enthusiastic retrospective review, Apple Music complimented Rubio's fushion of contemporary pop/Traditional Mexican folk music crossover, writing, "[Paulina] shows a mix in an explicit way and is a sonic walk through different styles and intensities, with extracts from ranchera, bolero, electronic pop, ballads and guitar rock."

In December 2001, Rubio received recognition from the Premios Ondas for Best Latin Revelation Artist or Group due "her way of applying spectacularity to Latin rhythms" in the music.

Accolades

Commercial performance
Worldwide the album sold 1.6 million copies the first year, the figure increased to 2.5 million in 2002. Since then, worldwide sales stands at 3 million. According to a report from EFE, those sales came mainly from United States, Mexico, Spain, Colombia, Central America and Venezuela. After reaching the 2 million mark worldwide, her record company gave her a double Diamond certification. The presentation to grant these recognitions to Rubio was made in December 2001 during the TV show Otro Rollo.
alone
Paulina was certified 4× Platinum in Mexico according to AMPROFON after reaching sales of 600,000 units. In the United States, Paulina reportedly sold 255,000 copies in 2001. It reached number one on the Billboard Top Latin Albums chart on February 24, 2001, 33 weeks after its debut on the chart and it stayed there for two consecutive weeks. On May 26, a year after its release, the album topped the chart again at number one. During that period, she received her first standard-type gold certification for shipping 500,000 copies in that country. The album reaching No. 156 on the Billboard 200 and No. 6 Heatseekers Albums. With its success, Rubio held the record for the highest 2001 sales by a Latin artist and in total was certified 8× platinum for the shipping of 800,000 copies in the U.S alone. As of January 2004, Nielsen SoundScan reported a total of 480,000 units in the US.

Paulina also peaked at number one on the Mexican Albums Chart and reached the number two in Spain. With this album, Paulina achieved international recognition and success, as several of the album's singles entered the Top 10 on Billboard's Hot Latin Songs chart in the US. The album was certified Gold and Platinum in Mexico, U.S, Colombia, Central America, Venezuela, Spain, Argentina and Chile.

Track listing

Notes 
 "Sexy Dance" is stylized as "Sexi Dance".

Personnel
Credits adapted from the liner notes of Paulina.

 Paulina Rubio – lead vocals, composer
 Estéfano – producer, director, composer, acoustic guitar, background vocals
 Marcello Azevedo — composer, electric guitar, bass, programming, background vocals
 Chris Rodriguez — producer, keyboards, programming, background vocals
 Armando Manzanero  — composer
 Juan Gabriel  — composer
 Christian De Walden  — composer
 Carlos Toro Montoro  — composer
 Richard Daniel Roman  — composer
 Ralf Stemmann  — composer
 Alejandro Abad  — composer
 Francisco Pellicer — producer

 Javier Carrion – electric guitar, bass, engineering
 Silvio Richetto – keyboards, engineering
 Santi Maspons – engineering 
 Rene Luis Toledo – acoustic & electric guitars
 Jonathan Kreisberg – electric guitar
 Tony Concepcion – trumpet
 Brian Lamar – bass 
 Ivan Zervigon – percussion
 Marc Martin – programming
 Santi Maspons – programming
 Michael Consculluela – background vocals
 Beth Cohen – background vocals
 Jessica Chirinos – background vocals
 Jori Horivitz – background vocals
 Adriana Mezzadri – background vocals
 Odisa Beltran – background vocals
 Joan Carles Capdevilla – background vocals
 Tulio Tonelli – background vocals

Charts

Weekly charts

Year-end charts

Decade-end charts

Certifications and sales

See also
 List of number-one Billboard Top Latin Albums of 2001
 List of number-one Billboard Latin Pop Albums from the 2000s
 Lo Nuestro Award for Pop Album of the Year
 List of best-selling albums in Mexico
 List of best-selling Latin albums
 Latin American music in the United States
 2000 in Latin music

References

External links
 
 

2000 albums
Paulina Rubio albums
Universal Music Latino albums
Albums produced by Estéfano
Spanish-language albums
Latin pop albums by Mexican artists
Lists of number-one Latin albums in the United States